Farhad Kazemi (born 1 July 1959 in Tehran) is an Iranian football coach

With many professional clubs in his résumé, Kazemi has established himself as one of the top coaches in a country which has many enthusiastic football lovers – Iran.

Farhad Kazemi was very successful in coaching Sepahan F.C. during the 2002–03 season to make the Isfahan based club, the first non-Tehran team to win an Iranian league. He was presented with the Best Manager of the Iran Pro League award  The Persian Gulf Cup after the 2002-03 season and is the all-time best Manager of the Azadegan League managing to successfully gain the most promotions and championships.

Early life
Farhad Kazemi was born on 2 July 1959 in Tehran. He is a former player, who now works as a coach in Iranian football. He started his athletic career by participating in the sport of wrestling at the age of 13, and bowed out after 3 years. Later, he had an approach towards football, he also tried participating in various sports at high school; sports such as volleyball, wrestling and most importantly football.

Playing career
He started playing for the youth team of Ekbatan, then played for Bootan and Akam, under the supervisions of Madad Noei, Parviz Abootaleb and Hossein Farzami respectively.
Then, he played for Kian football club, under the supervision of Akbar Khoshkbari. Later, he moved to Pas to play for them for 3 years under the supervision of Mehdi Monajati. He moved to Rah Ahan in 1989 and played for club until 1990.

Coaching career
Farhad Kazemi has coached many clubs in Iran, most of which have been in the first division. He managed to have a very successful spell at Sepahan from 2002 to 2005, this success gained him a lot of recognition.

Temporary Suspension from coaching in The IPL
A set of regulations were published by The Iran Pro League (IPL) Organisation stating some laws that players and coaches needed to perform by, otherwise they would consequently be suspended from activities in the league.

The so-called “Manshoor Akhalghi” was very much criticised by the people, criticising the charter itself as well as the people who took the biased decisions. It had been a very controversial matter in Iranian media, and many arguments erupted in Iranian football.

The Iran Pro League Organisation accused Farhad Kazemi of being a “Manshoori” and was put on the suspension list, stopping him from having any activities in the Pro League. He joined Aboomoslem Mashhad F.C. in November 2009 but the organisation did not give him the permit to sit on the bench as they mentioned the fact that he is on the suspension list, providing no evidence to prove their accusations.

Subsequently Farhad Kazemi joined and coached Gostaresh Foolad F.C. who played in a lower division, the Azadegan League, he managed to take them to the final of the Hazfi Cup (FA Cup) after beating many teams like Zob Ahan F.C., only to lose to Tehran giants Persepolis F.C. in the final.

After many debates, it was agreed that Farhad Kazemi’s name would be taken off the suspension list; otherwise the complaints from Farhad Kazemi would be taken further, and into courts.

Honours

Coach
Asian Club Championship
Winner: 1
1992–93 with Pas Tehran as Assistant Manager
Iranian Football League
Winner: 1
2002–03 with Sepahan
Runner up: 2
1995–96 with Bahman 
1996–97 with Bahman
Azadegan League
Winner: 1
2011–12 with Paykan
2013–14 with Paykan
Runner up: 1
2005–06 with Paykan
Hazfi Cup
Winner: 1
2003–04 with Sepahan
Runner up: 3
1996–97 with Bahman
1999–00 with Bahman
2009–10 with Gostaresh Foolad

Notable record
In 2002-2005 and 2008-2009 as the coach of Sepahan, he faced Esteghlal 11 times in different competitions. Out of those 11 matches, he could get 8 wins, 2 draw and only 1 loss.

Therefore, he became the record-holder in the history of Rivalries between Esteghlal and Sepahan.

References

External links

 Official Website
 Official Facebook Page

Living people
Iranian football managers
Sanat Mes Kerman F.C. managers
Sepahan S.C. managers
1959 births
Iranian futsal coaches
Paykan F.C. managers
Iran national futsal team managers
Saba Qom F.C. managers
Persian Gulf Pro League managers